Tabla Nani is an Indian theatre and film actor who works primarily in Kannada cinema. He began his career as a supporting actor in the 2006 Kannada film Mata. His 2009 film Eddelu Manjunatha was positively reviewed.

Career
A theatre actor, Nani began his film career with the 2006 Kannada film Mata. He was positively reviewed in the 2009 film, Eddelu Manjunatha and Rambo (2012). His film Akka Pakka was also positively reviewed.

Partial filmography

 Mata (2006) - Venugopal
 Eddelu Manjunatha (2009) - Nani
 Sanju Weds Geetha (2011)
 Kaanchana (2011) - Manja
 Maduve Mane (2011)
 Hudugaru (2011)
 90 (2011)
 Lucky (2012)
 Addhuri (2012)
 Rambo (2012) - Prem Kumar
 Myna (2013)
 Akka Pakka (2013) - Bhuvan (Bukka)
 Ale (2013)
 Victory (2013) - Choornaananda
 Shathru (2013 film) (2013)
 Sweety Nanna Jodi (2013)
 Bhajarangi (2013)
 Devarane (2013)
 Director's Special (2013)
 Jeethu (2013)
 Rangan Style (2014)
 Chathurbhuja (2014)
 Huchudugaru (2014)
 Love Show (2014)
 Bahaddur (2014)
 Raja Rajendra (2015)
 Endendigu (2015)
 Ranna (2015) - Gowtham PA 1
 Bullet Basya (2015)
 Khaidi (2015)
 Mrugashira (2015)
 Pataragitti (2015)
 Kotigobba 2 / Mudinja Ivana Pudi (2016)
 Mungaru Male 2 (2016)
 Mukunda Murari (2016) - Tabla Nani
 Beautiful Manasugalu (2017)
 Raaga (2017)
 Tiger (2017)
 Vaira (2017) - Ramayya
 Samyuktha 2 (2017) - Lecturer
 Nan Magale Heroine (2017)
 Chowka (2017)
 Jilebi (2017)
 Devrantha Manushya (2018)
 Krishna Tulasi (2018) - Cheluvarayaswamy
 Dhwaja (2018)
 Bhootayyana Mommaga Ayyu (2018)
 Victory 2 (2018)
 Raambo 2 (2018)
 Kismath (2018)
 Chemistry Of Kariyappa (2019)
 Ammana Mane (2019)
 Gara (2019)
 Vyuha (2019)
 Ellidde Illi Tanaka (2019)
 Mane Maratakkide (2019)
 Kalidasa Kannada Meshtru (2019)
 Damayanthi (2019)
 Navelru... Half Boiled (2019)
 Odeya (2019)
 Ommomme (2020)
 Kotigobba 3 (2020)
 Nan Hesaru Kishora Yel Pass Yentu (2021)
 Wheelchair Romeo (2022) as Autoshankar

References

External links
 

Indian male film actors
Living people
Male actors in Kannada cinema
Male actors from Karnataka
21st-century Indian male actors
Year of birth missing (living people)